Droit House is a Grade II listed building and former customs house in Margate that was redesigned by William Edmunds.

It was originally built in 1812 and rebuilt in 1828–30.

It was destroyed during the Second World War but was rebuilt in 1947.

References

Buildings and structures in Kent
Margate
Grade II listed buildings in Kent